Scouting is active in New Caledonia. The Scouts et Guides de France is the largest Scout Association on the island. Scouts Vaillants is a smaller association.

Scouts from New Caledonia participated in the 1998 World Jamboree in Chile, and in the Australian Jamboree in 2013.

The Scout Motto is Sois Prêt (Be Prepared) or Toujours Prêt (Always Prepared) in French, depending on the organization.

See also

 Scouting in France

Overseas branches of Scouting and Guiding associations
Scouting and Guiding in France
Scouting and Guiding by country